Thieves Like Us is a six-part BBC Three sitcom which was first broadcast in 2007, based on the 2001 book The Burglar Diaries.

It follows the lives of Bex and Ollie, a pair of burglars who make their living by burgling factories, warehouses, offices and shops, and take work wherever they can find it.

It is written by The Burglar Diaries author, Danny King; each episode lasts around 25 minutes.CastEpisode guide1. The Warehouse JobFirst aired: 22 January 2007
Bex and Ollie have a warehouse burglary all set up for an eager client, but Bex's angry girlfriend Mel puts the entire enterprise in jeopardy.2. The Alarm JobFirst aired: 29 January 2007
When Mel is kept awake by a neighbour's burglar alarm going off, she asks Bex to go over and fix the problem.3. The Teapot JobFirst aired: 2/5/2007
When Bex and Ollie's fence is himself the victim of a burglary, he asks them to find the thieves and recover the valuable antique teapot that was stolen.4. The Jackets JobFirst aired: 2/12/2007
Detective Haynes finally thinks he has enough evidence to arrest Bex and Ollie. Can they rely on a clever lawyer to get them free?5. The Footballer JobFirst aired: 19 February 2007
When a bad-boy footballer tosses Mel's young cousin's bicycle into the river, she asks Bex and Ollie to persuade him to make an apology.6. The Office Job'
First aired: 26 February 2007
Bex and Ollie have interviews for real jobs, albeit in telemarketing, but Ollie's girlfriend Mel is suspicious of their motives, especially when she discovers that the police are looking for the pair.

External links
 

 
 Danny King

2007 British television series debuts
2007 British television series endings
2000s British sitcoms
BBC television sitcoms
2000s British crime television series
2000s British teen sitcoms
Television shows based on British novels
English-language television shows